Pholidichthys is a genus of ray-finned fish which consists of two species of the tropical Pacific Ocean. It is the only genus in the family Pholidichthyidae, one of two families in the order Cichliformes.

Species

The following two species are found within this genus and family:

 Pholidichthys anguis Springer & Larson, 1996
 Pholidichthys leucotaenia Bleeker, 1856

References

Cichliformes
Marine fish genera
Taxa named by Pieter Bleeker